"Geek Stink Breath" is a song by American rock band Green Day. It was released on September 25, 1995 as the lead single and fourth track from their fourth studio album, Insomniac (1995). The song, along with "Stuck with Me", appeared on the live EP Foot in Mouth that was only released in Japan. The lyrics tell of the effects of methamphetamine on the human body; the word "geek" is slang for methamphetamine.

Composition
Written in 1994, "Geek Stink Breath" was played alongside with "Stuart and the Ave." during a soundcheck at Chicago in November 1994 (the video can be found on the video game Green Day: Rock Band) and the song debuted live on December 3, 1994 during Green Day's first performance on Saturday Night Live. The word "shit" in the line "wish in one hand and shit in the other and see which one gets filled first" was left uncensored since the show's production team could not understand the lyrics to the new song (closed caption typed it as "unintelligible lyrics") and were not aware that the band had sworn on TV. The song was later recorded and released on the band's fourth studio album Insomniac (1995), and as the album's lead-off single.

The lyrics tell of the singer leading a "path of self-destruction" through the use of methamphetamine, and the effects of this drug on his body. The lyrics were inspired by Armstrong's own experiences, as well as the people around him that he saw lose control of their lives because of their addictions. Featuring a classic punk three-chord riff, the song pays homage to the band's early punk influences, including the Ramones and the Sex Pistols. The song ended up being a moderate hit.

A live version of the song recorded on the band's 21st Century Breakdown World Tour in Saitama-Shi, Japan was included on the band's 2011 live album Awesome as Fuck and its accompanying bonus DVD.

Track listing

7"

Vinyl Box Set

Music video
The video includes distorted, low-resolution footage of the band playing the song in a basement, intercut with graphic footage of one of the band's friends having a tooth pulled by a dentist, which was intended to only be shown during late night hours on MTV. This footage is relevant to the song, as it features the lyrics: "and it's rotting out my teeth". (Oral problems are associated with meth use, but are actually related to poor hygiene, exacerbated by dry mouth, both of which are associated with illicit use of some drugs, rather than being directly related to the effect of smoking or otherwise ingesting methamphetamine.) The video was directed by Mark Kohr. An edited version of the music video is shown internationally.

Charts

References

External links
 

1995 singles
Green Day songs
Songs about drugs
Song recordings produced by Rob Cavallo
Songs written by Billie Joe Armstrong
1995 songs
Songs written by Tré Cool
Songs written by Mike Dirnt
Reprise Records singles